Číhaň is a municipality and village in Klatovy District in the Plzeň Region of the Czech Republic. It has about 200 inhabitants.

Administrative parts
Villages of Nový Dvůr and Plánička are administrative parts of Číhaň.

References

Villages in Klatovy District